Rivercrest High School is a 2A public high school located in Bogata, Texas (USA). It is part of the Rivercrest Independent School District located in southwest Red River County and northwest Titus County and a small portion of Franklin County. It was created by the consolidation of Bogata and neighboring Talco in Titus County. In 2011, the school was rated "Academically Acceptable" by the Texas Education Agency.

Athletics
The Rivercrest Rebels compete in the following sports:

Baseball
Basketball
Football
Golf
Powerlifting
Softball
Tennis
Track and field
Volleyball
Band

State Titles
Boys Basketball - 
2006(1A/D1)
Girls Basketball - 
1968(2A), 1980(1A)

State Finalists
Girls Basketball - 
1979(1A)

References

External links
Rivercrest ISD

Schools in Red River County, Texas
Public high schools in Texas